Time Sharing is a 1986 novel by Richard Krawiec, published by Viking Press. Taking place in Philadelphia, its main characters are Artie, a purse-snatcher, and Jolene, a single mother. Artie hopes that by pretending to befriend Jolene he can profit from her. Jolene tries to see good in Artie and hopes he can act as a father for her son, Dandy. In time, Artie genuinely cares for Jolene. The novel ends moments after Artie accidentally shoots a cashier in a holdup. As he waits to be apprehended, Artie feels no remorse for shooting the cashier, but he grieves over the impending loss of his relationship with Jolene.

Another novel by Richard Krawiec is Faith In What?.

1986 American novels
Novels set in Philadelphia